Zhong Shan (born October 1955) is a Chinese politician and business executive, who served as the Commerce Minister of the People's Republic of China from February 2017 to December 2020.

Career 
Zhong Shan was born in Shangyu, Zhejiang, and he joined to work in 1972. His first job was Chief of Section in Zhejiang Textile Import & Export Corporation. In 1998, he served as the Director of Foreign Trade and Economic Cooperation Department of Zhejiang. He was served as the vice Governor of Zhejiang since 2003.

In 2008, he was appointed as the Vice Minister of Commerce. In March 2013, he was named China's International Trade Representative (minister-level). In February 2017, Zhong was appointed as the Minister of Commerce by the Standing Committee of the National People's Congress.

Zhong was with Vice Premier Liu He to witness the signing of the first trade deal with the US President Donald Trump in January 2020.

References 

1955 births
Living people
Ministers of Commerce of the People's Republic of China
Political office-holders in Zhejiang
People's Republic of China politicians from Zhejiang
People from Shangyu
Businesspeople from Shaoxing